Hello is a Bengali-language streaming television series streaming on Hoichoi produced by SVF. The series stars Raima Sen, Joy Sengupta and Priyanka Sarkar. In the first scene of this series Raima Sen as Nandita received an MMS from an unknown number showing her husband Ananyo (Joy Sengupta) making love with Nina (Priyanka Sarkar) that turns her life upside down.

Plot 
Hello offers a unique blend of drama and psychological thriller. The series revolves around the life of Nina, Nandita, and Anonyo, Nandita's philandering husband. Season 1, of the Hello series, begins when Nandita receives a series of MMS with romantic messages that expose her husband Anonyo's extra-marital affair with Nina. As the mystery thickens, Nandita realizes that the MMS can be aimed at her.

The success of the first installment of the Hello series propels it to Season 2, where all questions get answered, as Anonyo learns that he was manipulated by Nina and that reaching Nandita was Nina's actual aim.

Season 3, of the Hello series, forms to be an excellent conclusive continuation of its past prequels, introducing some new characters. The series will provide new challenges for Nina, Nandita, and Anonyo as they confront their inner demons.

Cast 
Raima Sen as Nandita
Priyanka Sarkar as Nina / Debalina Som
Joy Sengupta as Ananyo Bose
Saheb Bhattacharya as Rongit
Pamela Singh Bhutoria as Ria
Ambarish Bhattacharya as Ambarish

Episodes

Season 1 (2017)
The first season of Hello started streaming in September 2017, and it was hoichoi's first Original content to start streaming on the app and website. It was the debut of Raima Sen in streaming series in Bengali.

Episodes

Season 2 (2018) 
After a gap of more than one-year hoichoi released the second season of hello with 8 episodes. The story begins where it was ended in season 1, The cast remains the same as season 1.

Episodes

Season 3 (2021) 
On 22 January 2021 Hoichoi released the third season of the series with brand new twelve episodes. This time Saheb Bhattacharya & Pamela Bhutoria played an important role in the series.

Episodes

References

External links

Indian web series
2017 web series debuts
Bengali-language web series
Hoichoi original programming